"Magic 8" is the second single from New Zealand rock band Atlas released in 2007. It peaked at #27 on the New Zealand singles chart.

References 

Atlas (band) songs
2007 singles
2007 songs
Song articles with missing songwriters